Robyn Longhurst  is a New Zealand human geography academician, and as of 2006 is a full professor at the University of Waikato.

Academic career

After a 1996 PhD titled  'Geographies that matter: Pregnant bodies in public places'  at the University of Waikato, Longhurst joined the staff, rising to full professor.

In 2018 Longhurst was elected a Fellow of the Royal Society of New Zealand.

Selected works 
 Longhurst, Robyn. "Semi-structured interviews and focus groups." Key methods in geography 3 (2003): 143–156.
 Longhurst, Robyn. Bodies: Exploring fluid boundaries. Routledge, 2004.
 Johnston, Lynda, and Robyn Longhurst. Space, place, and sex: Geographies of sexualities. Rowman & Littlefield, 2009.
 Longhurst, Robyn, Elsie Ho, and Lynda Johnston. "Using 'the body’as an 'instrument of research': kimch’i and pavlova." Area 40, no. 2 (2008): 208–217.
 Longhurst, Robyn. "VIEWPOINT The body and geography." Gender, Place & Culture 2, no. 1 (1995): 97–106.

References

External links
  
 

Living people
New Zealand women academics
Year of birth missing (living people)
Academic staff of the University of Waikato
University of Waikato alumni
New Zealand geographers
Human geographers
New Zealand feminists
New Zealand women writers
Fellows of the Royal Society of New Zealand